Edward Armstrong  (3 March 1846 – 14 April 1928) was an English historian.

Biography
He was born in Tidenham, Gloucestershire, the son of John Armstrong, later Bishop of Grahamstown.

Armstrong was educated at Bradfield College and Exeter College, Oxford, and became a Fellow of The Queen's College, Oxford. Armstrong wrote books on Charles V, Elisabeth Farnese, and Lorenzo de' Medici. He also contributed to The Cambridge Modern History and the 1911 Encyclopædia Britannica.

Armstrong served as warden of Bradfield College from 1920 to 1925.

His first wife, Mabel née Watson, died in 1920. In 1921 he married his second wife, Geraldine Prynne Harriss (born 1899), who was the third daughter of Rev. James Adolphus Harriss (1859–1919).

Selected publications

References

External links 
 
 

1846 births
1928 deaths
19th-century English historians
Fellows of the British Academy
Fellows of The Queen's College, Oxford
People educated at Bradfield College
Alumni of Exeter College, Oxford
People from Tidenham
20th-century English historians